Asmat Regency is a regency (kabupaten) in the northern portion of the Indonesian province of South Papua. It was split off from Merauke Regency (of which it had been a part) on 12 November 2002. Asmat Regency consists of an area of 31,983.44 km2, and had a population of 76,577 at the 2010 Census, 88,373 at the 2015 Intermediate Census, and 110,105 at the 2020 Census, mostly from the Asmat ethnic group. The administrative centre of the regency is the town of Agats.

A measles outbreak and famine killed at least 72 people in Asmat regency in early 2018, during which 652 children were affected by measles and 223 suffered from malnutrition.

Administrative districts
Asmat Regency in 2010 comprised eight districts (distrik), listed below with their populations at the 2010 Census. 

However, by 2012 the number of districts had increased to nineteen; the eleven additional districts created in 2011 and 2012 were Kopay, Der Koumur, Safan, Sirets, Ayip, Betcbamu, Kolf Braza, Jetsy, Unir Sirau, Joerat, and Pulau Tiga. In 2016 another four districts were created (Awyu, Aswi, Joutu and Koroway Buluanop), bringing the total to twenty-three districts, comprising 221 administrative villages. The districts are listed below with their areas and their populations at the 2020 Census. The table also includes the locations of the district administrative centres, and the number of administrative villages (rural desa and urban kelurahan) in each district.

Villages
Atsy
Bis Agats
Omandesep
Otsjanep

See also
 Asmat people
 Lorentz National Park

References

External links

Statistics publications from Statistics Indonesia (BPS)

Regencies of South Papua
Populated places established in 2002
2002 establishments in Indonesia